The Oxford Academy, located in Westbrook, Connecticut, is an independent college preparatory boarding school.

History 
The school was founded in 1906 in Pleasantville, New Jersey, by psychologist Dr. Joseph M. Weidberg.  Weidberg was concerned that students were not being well served in traditional educational settings and not thriving due to academic learning differences.

In 1941, school enrollment was limited to a maximum of 15 students, but has since grown to 48 students. In 1947 Dr. Edward R. Knight was selected to succeed Dr. Weidberg as Headmaster followed by Frank Effinger in 1973, Dr. Jonathan A. Woodhall in 1975, and Philip H. Davis in 1983.  In 2010, Philip B. Cocchiola was appointed Head of the School.

Faculty

As of 2020, the faculty of Oxford consisted of 23 part-time members and three part time teachers. Most members of the staff live on campus.

References

External links
 

Educational institutions established in 1906
Private high schools in Connecticut
Boarding schools in Connecticut
Schools in Middlesex County, Connecticut
Westbrook, Connecticut
1906 establishments in Connecticut